Lysiosepalum rugosum, also known as the wrinkled-leaf lysiosepalum, is a species of flowering plant in the mallow family that is endemic to Australia.

Description
The species grows as a dense, erect shrub up to 1.5 m in height. The leaves are 15–50 mm long and 2–7 mm wide. The blue-purple-pink flowers appear from July to November.

Distribution and habitat
The plants are found in the Avon Wheatbelt, Coolgardie, Geraldton Sandplains and Jarrah Forest IBRA bioregions of south-west Western Australia. They grow on sandy, clay, gravelly and lateritic soils.

References

rugosum
Rosids of Western Australia
Malvales of Australia
Taxa named by George Bentham
Plants described in 1863